Kubrick Mons is the name given to the largest of a series of mountain peaks on Pluto's moon Charon that rise out of depressions in the Vulcan Planum region. The feature was first recorded by the Long Range Reconnaissance Imager (LORRI) aboard the New Horizons spacecraft during a flyby on 15 July 2015.

Physical description 
It is not currently known how Kubrick Mons formed; however, there is speculation that Kubrick Mons may be a cryovolcano and the depression may be the result of a shrinking chamber of water and ammonia.  this hypothesis remains to be confirmed.

The mountain was named after film director Stanley Kubrick. Official approval of the name was announced by the International Astronomical Union on 11 April 2018.  It is sometimes called Charon's  or more simply .

References

Extraterrestrial mountains
Surface features of Charon
Stanley Kubrick